The Centre Block, part of the complex of parliamentary buildings on Parliament Hill in Canada's capital, Ottawa, hosts a gallery of portraits of present and former Canadian monarchs, former Prime Ministers of Canada, and other figures.

History
The collection of portraits of Canada's monarchs originated with the acquiring of a state portrait of Queen Victoria for the parliament buildings of the Province of Canada in Montreal in 1849. As successive monarchs came to the throne, their portraits were added to the gallery. However, it was not until Senator Serge Joyal took on the personal project of amassing portraits of monarchs prior to Victoria that the collection came closer to completion, including the Kings of France since Francis I.

The prime minister's portrait gallery dates back to 1890, when John A. Macdonald, the first prime minister of the Dominion of Canada, assisted in the unveiling of his own portrait. At first, the works were commissioned by friends and colleagues, made by the artist's own initiative, and then donated to the Crown Collection. A century later, a more systematic approach was implemented, and the artist is now chosen by the prime minister, although Curatorial Services provide suggerences and assistance on the choice.

The portraits are viewed by over 400,000 people a year.

Works

Paintings of French monarchs

Paintings of British monarchs

Paintings of Canadian monarchs

Paintings of prime ministers

Paintings of Speakers of the House of Assembly of the Province of Lower Canada

Speakers of the House of Assembly of the Province of Upper Canada

Paintings of Speakers of the Legislative Assembly of the Province of Canada

Paintings of Speakers of the House of Commons

Paintings of the Fathers of Confederation

Paintings of historic events and people

Sculptures

Notes

References

Parliament of Canada buildings